Vargsundet is a strait in Hammerfest Municipality in Troms og Finnmark county, Norway. It separates the island of Seiland from the mainland. Vargsundet opens up into Altafjorden to the southwest, and to Straumen to the northeast. The river Porsa debouches into the strait, from southeast.

References

Straits of Norway
Landforms of Troms og Finnmark
Hammerfest